The Province of the Orange Free State, commonly referred to as the Orange Free State, Free State or by its abbreviation OFS, was one of the four provinces of South Africa from 1910 to 1994. After 27 April 1994 it was dissolved following the first non-racial election in South Africa. It is now called the Free State Province.

Its predecessor was the Orange River Colony which in 1902 had replaced the Orange Free State, a Boer republic.

Its outside borders were the same as those of the modern Free State Province; except for the bantustans ("homelands") of QwaQwa and one part of Bophuthatswana, which were contained on land inside of the provincial Orange Free State borders.

Districts in 1991
Districts of the province and population at the 1991 census. 

 Zastron: 14,122
 Rouxville: 11,904
 Bethulie: 9,333
 Smithfield: 7,946
 Wepener: 12,964
 Dewetsdorp: 13,521
 Reddersburg: 6,070
 Edenburg: 6,968
 Trompsburg: 5,138
 Jagersfontein: 6,353
 Bloemfontein: 300,150
 Petrusburg: 11,071
 Brandfort: 23,521
 Botshabelo: 177,926
 Philippolis: 7,056
 Fauresmith: 8,916
 Koffiefontein: 10,778
 Jacobsdal: 9,748
 Boshof: 32,033
 Theunissen: 38,482
 Bultfontein: 28,556
 Hoopstad: 27,934
 Wesselsbron: 26,494
 Odendaalsrus: 97,603
 Welkom: 248,186
 Virginia: 81,780
 Hennenman: 25,165
 Ventersburg: 14,534
 Ladybrand: 30,532
 Excelsior: 18,051
 Clocolan: 18,542
 Marquard: 17,217
 Winburg: 17,765
 Senekal: 41,551
 Ficksburg: 36,810
 Fouriesburg: 16,932
 Bethlehem: 80,921
 Lindley: 37,664
 Reitz: 30,712
 Harrismith: 63,220
 Vrede: 37,324
 Kroonstad: 110,963
 Bothaville: 54,726
 Viljoenskroon: 59,279
 Vredefort: 13,518
 Koppies: 19,723
 Parys: 48,678
 Sasolburg: 89,079
 Heilbron: 40,987
 Frankfort: 44,617

Administrators

See also 
 Orange Free State
 Free State (South African province)

References

History of South Africa
Former provinces of South Africa
States and territories established in 1910
States and territories disestablished in 1994
1910 establishments in South Africa
1994 disestablishments in South Africa